Leo Rolly Carnando (born 29 July 2001) is an Indonesian badminton player affiliated with PB Djarum club. He was a World Junior Champions in the mixed doubles in 2018 and in the boys' doubles in 2019, also won double gold at the 2019 Asian Junior Championships in the boys' and mixed doubles events. Carnando was part of Indonesia winning team at the 2020 Thomas Cup.

Career 
Carnando was selected to join the Djarum club in 2015. He has focused on playing in the doubles category. In 2016, he won the boys' doubles titles at the USM Flypower Open, Astec Open Badminton Championships and Singapore Youth International Series. He also won the mixed doubles title at the Walikota Surabaya Open, National circuit in Lampung and West Java. In 2017, he clinched double title by winning the U17 boys' and mixed doubles events at the Jaya Raya Indonesia Junior International, then won the boys' doubles title at the Walikota Surabaya Bank Jatim Victor Open, National circuit in North Sulawesi, and also the mixed doubles title at the National circuit in Central Java.

Carnando was selected to join the Indonesia National training center in 2018. He alongside Indonesia team won the bronze medal at the Asian Junior Championships in Jakarta. Unfortunately, in the individual  events, he was defeated in the early stage. Carnando claimed his first title in the BWF sanctioned tournament at the India Junior International, where he and Daniel Marthin beat their compatriot Pramudya Kusumawardana and Ghifari Anandaffa Prihardika in the final. A week later, the duo won the Malaysia International Junior Open. In November, he won the gold medal in the mixed doubles with partner Indah Cahya Sari Jamil at the Markham World Junior Championships. It was a surprise, because they entered the tournament as an unseeded pair, having only paired a few months earlier. While in the team event, he helped Indonesia win the bronze medal. Carnando claimed his first senior International title by winning the Bangladesh International in both mixed and men's doubles. He then reached two finals in the Turkey International, and won a title in the men's doubles. For his achievements in 2018, Carnado was nominated as Eddy Choong Most Promising Player of the Year with Marthin, and was named Djarum Outstanding Young Athlete with Jamil.

In March 2019, Carnando finished as runner-up in the boys' doubles with Daniel Marthin in the German Junior. In May, he clinched two titles at the Jaya Raya Junior Grand Prix, winning the boys' doubles with Marthin, and in the mixed doubles with Indah Cahya Sari Jamil. In June, he and Marthin also won the Malaysia International Series. At the Asian Junior Championships, Carnando took two gold medals. He topped the podium in the boys' doubles with Marthin, and in the mixed doubles with Jamil. Carnando and Marthin then won the Kazan World Junior Championships beating top seeds Di Zijian and Wang Chang. However, he was unable to defend his mixed doubles title with Jamil. In the team event, he also helped the National team finish as runner-up in Asian Junior and win the Suhandinata Cup by defeating China in the mixed team final of World Junior Championships.

Entering the senior level, Carnando focused on only playing in the men's doubles. He started the year as semi-finalists at the Thailand Open with Daniel Marthin. They later stopped in the quarter-finals at the Swiss Open and Spain Masters. They then reached the finals of the Hylo Open, but was defeated by World number 1 Marcus Fernaldi Gideon  and Kevin Sanjaya Sukamuljo in straight game. Carnanado made his debut with Indonesia team at the 2020 Thomas Cup, which is Indonesia won the Thomas Cup after 19 years.

Carnando began the 2022 season as quarter-finalists in the All England and Swiss Opens. In May, he took part at the Southeast Asian Games, and won a gold medal in the men's doubles with Marthin and a bronze medal in the men's team event. In July, Carnando and Marthin clinched their first World Tour title at the Singapore Open by beating Fajar Alfian and Muhammad Rian Ardianto in the final.

2023 
Carnando began the 2023 BWF World Tour at the Malaysia Open, but defeated in the second round to Danish pair Kim Astrup and Anders Skaarup Rasmussen. In the following week, he lost in the first round of India Open from their compatriot 8th seed Marcus Fernaldi Gideon and Kevin Sanjaya Sukamuljo. They then emerged victorious in the Indonesia and Thailand Masters, entering them to the top 10 of the BWF world rankings.

Awards and nominations

Achievements

Southeast Asian Games 
Men's doubles

World Junior Championships 
Boys' doubles

Mixed doubles

Asian Junior Championships 
Boys' doubles

Mixed doubles

BWF World Tour (3 titles, 1 runner-up) 
The BWF World Tour, which was announced on 19 March 2017 and implemented in 2018, is a series of elite badminton tournaments sanctioned by the Badminton World Federation (BWF). The BWF World Tour is divided into levels of World Tour Finals, Super 1000, Super 750, Super 500, Super 300, and the BWF Tour Super 100.

Men's doubles

BWF International Challenge/Series (4 titles, 1 runner-up) 
Men's doubles

Mixed doubles

  BWF International Challenge tournament
  BWF International Series tournament

BWF Junior International (4 titles, 2 runners-up) 
Boys' doubles

Mixed doubles

  BWF Junior International Grand Prix tournament
  BWF Junior International Challenge tournament
  BWF Junior International Series tournament
  BWF Junior Future Series tournament

Performance timeline

National team 
 Junior level

 Senior level

Individual competitions

Junior level 
Boys' doubles

Mixed doubles

Senior level 
Men's doubles

References

External links 
 

2001 births
Living people
People from Klaten Regency
Sportspeople from Central Java
Indonesian male badminton players
Competitors at the 2021 Southeast Asian Games
Southeast Asian Games bronze medalists for Indonesia
Southeast Asian Games medalists in badminton
Southeast Asian Games gold medalists for Indonesia
21st-century Indonesian people